Events from the year 1961 in Sweden

Incumbents
 Monarch – Gustaf VI Adolf 
 Prime Minister – Tage Erlander

Events

 18 September – UN Secretary General Dag Hammarskjöld is killed in a plane crash in Ndola, Northern Rhodesia.

Births
 25 April – Agneta Andersson, canoer, three times Olympic champion.

Deaths

 7 January – Erik Lundqvist, javelin thrower (born 1908).
 5 February – Humbert Lundén, sailor (born 1882).
 18 September – Dag Hammarskjöld, UN Secretary General (born 1905).
 25 November – Claës König, nobleman, military officer and horse rider (born 1885).
  –  Ruth Gustafson

References

 
Years of the 20th century in Sweden